LaRosa is a common surname in the Italian Language meaning the rose. LaRosa is also a common surname within Sicilian families. It is also a surname of Cantabrian-Castilian origin. Larrosa is the Aragonese form of this surname.

People with the surname
 Eugenio La Rosa (born 1962), Peruvian footballer
 Guillermo La Rosa (born 1952), Peruvian footballer
 Julius La Rosa (1930-2016), American singer
 Liliana La Rosa (born 1964), Peruvian nurse and academic
 Luca La Rosa (born 1988), Italian footballer
 Maria LaRosa (born 1976), American meteorologist
 Tara LaRosa (born 1978), American mixed martial artist

See also
LaRosa's Pizzeria
La Rösa, a hamlet in the upper part of the Val Poschiavo in the canton of Graubünden, Switzerland
V. La Rosa and Sons Macaroni Company (La Rosa brand of macaroni)

References

Spanish-language surnames
Italian-language surnames